Tibellia is a genus of lichenized fungi in the family Ramalinaceae. This is a monotypic genus, containing the single species Tibellia dimerelloides. The genus is named after Swedish lichenologist Leif Tibell.

References

Ramalinaceae
Lichen genera
Monotypic Lecanorales genera
Taxa named by Josef Hafellner
Taxa named by Antonín Vězda
Taxa described in 1992